Guishan is a railway station of the Taiwan Railways Administration Yilan line located in Toucheng Township, Yilan County, Taiwan.

History
The station was opened on 10 December 1920.

Around the station
 Toucheng Leisure Farm

See also
 List of railway stations in Taiwan

References 

1920 establishments in Taiwan
Railway stations in Yilan County, Taiwan
Railway stations opened in 1920
Railway stations served by Taiwan Railways Administration